Gustave Gingras  (January 18, 1918 – May 9, 1996) was a Canadian physician and founder of the Montreal Institute of Rehabilitation in 1949.

Born in Montreal, Quebec, he studied medicine at the Université de Montréal following the completion of his BA at College Bourget in Rigaud, Quebec. In 1942, he joined the Royal Canadian Army Medical Corps and served overseas during World War II. There, he studied neurosurgery as an intern at the Canadian Neurosurgical and Plastic Surgery Hospital in Basingstoke, England. Upon his return to Canada, he was inspired by Wilder Penfield, a neurosurgeon in Montreal, to focus on helping paraplegic and quadriplegic veterans of the war. As an expert in rehabilitation of the disabled, he served as a consultant to the World Health Organization, the United Nations, the Canadian Red Cross and the Canadian International Development Agency. He was president of the Canadian Medical Association from 1972 to 1973. He was Chancellor of the University of Prince Edward Island from 1974 to 1982.

Honours
 In 1967, he received an honorary doctorate from Sir George Williams University, which later became Concordia University.
 In 1967, he was made an Officer of the Order of Canada.
 In 1972, he was promoted to Companion of the Order of Canada.
 In 1998, he was inducted into the Canadian Medical Hall of Fame.
 Knight of the Venerable Order of Saint John.

References

Famous Canadian Physicians: Dr. Gustave Gingras at Library and Archives Canada

External links
 Gustave Gingras at The Canadian Encyclopedia

1918 births
1996 deaths
Canadian neurosurgeons
Canadian university and college chancellors
Companions of the Order of Canada
Physicians from Montreal
Physicians from Prince Edward Island
20th-century surgeons
Canadian military personnel of World War II